Abdollah Hedayat (1899–1968) was an army officer who served as the chief of general staff at the Imperial Iran Army.

Early life and education
Hedayat was born in 1899 and was the son of Gholam Reza Hedayat, also known as Mokhber Al Dawlah. He graduated from the Nizam School of Mushir Al Dawlah, and studied military science in France receiving a degree from the War University.

Career
Following graduation Hedayat joined the Imperial Army and also, taught at Tehran University of War. 
From 26 June 1950 to 11 March 1951 he served as the minister of war in the cabinet of Prime Minister Haj Ali Razmara. On 7 September 1953 he was named the minister of national defense to the cabinet led by Prime Minister Fazlollah Zahedi. On 1955 Hedayat was appointed chief of the supreme commander's staff and became the first military officer to hold this title. He served in the post with rank of cabinet minister and was the minister of war from 1 April 1955 in the cabinet led by Prime Minister Hossein Ala'. His military rank was general. Hedayat's term ended in 1961, and he was replaced by Abdol Hossein Hejazi in the post.

Arrest
Hedayat and two other generals were arrested in November 1962 due to corruption allegations in an anti-corruption campaign initiated by Prime Minister Ali Amini. It was the Shah who advised Ali Amini to arrest them. Hedayat was taken to the Qasr prison and was tried between March and November 1963. He was sentenced to two-year prison in addition to the payment of a fine of nearly $16,000.

Personal life and death
Abdollah Hedayat was married to the sister of Sadegh Hedayat. He died in 1968.

Honors
Hedayat was the recipient of the US Legion of Merit for his actions during World War II in the Imperial Iranian army which was awarded to him in September 1955.

References

External links

20th-century Iranian politicians
1899 births
1968 deaths
Defence ministers of Iran
Imperial Iranian Armed Forces four-star generals
People of Pahlavi Iran
Iranian prisoners and detainees
Foreign recipients of the Legion of Merit